Damian Shane Cudlin (born 19 October 1982) is a professional motorcycle racer. He competed in the Endurance FIM World Championship from 2002 to 2018 and finished 2nd in the world championship on three occasions- 2011, 2012 and 2014. He was a 4th rider in the SERT (Suzuki Endurance Racing Team) who won the Endurance World Championship in 2015. After winning the 2010 IDM Supersport Championship, he made his grand prix debut at the German Grand Prix in 2010 where he finished 7th. He was drafted into MotoGP in 2011 and raced sporadically for various teams until 2015. He has also previously competed in the IDM Superbike Championship, World Supersport Championship, the Australian Formula Xtreme Championship, the Australian Superbike Championship and the AMA Superbike Championship.

Career statistics

Supersport World Championship

Races by year

Grand Prix motorcycle racing

By season

By class

Races by year
(key)

External links

 
 
 Damian Cudlin – Rider Bios at IDM – Internationale Deutsche Motorradmeisterschaft

Living people
Australian motorcycle racers
Pramac Racing MotoGP riders
Moto2 World Championship riders
1982 births
Supersport World Championship riders
FIM Superstock 1000 Cup riders
Aspar Racing Team MotoGP riders
MotoGP World Championship riders